A Hibernophile is a person who is fond of Irish culture, Irish language and Ireland in general. Its antonym is Hibernophobe. The word originates from "Hibernia", the word used by the ancient Romans to refer to Ireland.

The term is often used in particular for people all over the world (in America especially in areas where many Irish diaspora settled) who ostensibly base their business, political, or social practices on like of or admiration for Irish models. In some cases, Hibernophilia represents an individual's preference of Irish culture to their own, or the belief that Irish culture is superior, or appreciation of Irish history.

Hibernophiles often enjoy attending St. Patrick's Day parades that occur all over the world. They also tend to favour stereotypical parts of Irish culture: shamrocks, Leprechauns and shillelaghs.

In some cases a Hibernophile may also be called a Plastic Paddy, a pejorative term in Ireland, which refers to a person who appropriates stereotypical aspects of Irish culture without a deeper understanding.

See also 
 Culture of Ireland
 Plastic Paddy

Notes

References 
 
 

Irish culture
Irish nationalism
Admiration of foreign cultures